Fan Lai-chin (3 December 1951) is a Taiwanese politician who served on the Legislative Yuan from 1993 to 1996.

Between 1993 and 1996, Fan Lai-chin was a member of the Legislative Yuan, elected via Democratic Progressive Party list. He was head of the Kaohsiung City Government's labor bureau when the Kaohsiung MRT foreign workers scandal came to light in August 2005. Nine Kuomintang members of the Kaohsiung City Council sued Fan for malfeasance and forgery in September. Following his indictment in November, Fan was expelled from the Democratic Progressive Party.

References

1951 births
Living people
Democratic Progressive Party Members of the Legislative Yuan
Members of the 2nd Legislative Yuan
Party List Members of the Legislative Yuan